The 2007 NCAA Division II football season, part of college football in the United States organized by the National Collegiate Athletic Association at the Division II level, began on August 30, 2007, and concluded with the NCAA Division II Football Championship on December 15, 2007 at Braly Municipal Stadium in Florence, Alabama, hosted by the University of North Alabama. The Valdosta State Blazers defeated the Northwest Missouri State Bearcats, 25–20, to win their second Division II national title.

The Harlon Hill Trophy was awarded to Danny Woodhead, running back from Chadron State, for the second consecutive year.

Conference and program changes

Chowan and Mary completed their transitions to Division II and became eligible for the postseason.

Conference standings

Northeast Region

Southeast Region

Northwest Region

Southwest Region

Conference summaries

Postseason

The 2007 NCAA Division II National Football Championship playoffs involved 24 schools playing in a single-elimination tournament to determine the national champion of men's NCAA Division II college football.

The tournament began on November 17, 2008 and concluded on December 15, 2008 with the 2007 NCAA Division II National Football Championship game at Braly Municipal Stadium near the campus of the University of North Alabama in Florence, Alabama.

In the championship game the Valdosta State University Blazers defeated the Northwest Missouri State University Bearcats, 25–21, to win their second national championship.

Participants

Bids by conference

Playoff format
The first-round games were conducted on the campus of one of the competing institutions as determined by the NCAA Division II Football Committee. Two teams in each super regional earned first-round byes. The first-round winners advanced to face a bye team in their super regional. Second-round winners met in the quarterfinals and quarterfinal winners advanced to play in the semifinals.

First-round, second-round, quarterfinal and semifinal games were played on the campus of one of the competing institutions as determined by the NCAA Division II Football Committee. The home team at the championship was determined by the Division II Football Committee and the Shoals National Championship Committee.

National television coverage
The championship game was played at Braly Municipal Stadium in Florence, Alabama and broadcast live on ESPN2 on December 15.

Final standings

Bracket and standings

Super Regional 1

Super Regional 3

Super Regional 2

Super Regional 4

Semifinals and championship

See also
 2007 NCAA Division I FBS football season
 2007 NCAA Division I FCS football season
 2007 NCAA Division III football season
 2007 NAIA football season

References

External links
2007 Division II Football Playoffs at espn.com